Information technology in Pakistan is a growing industry that has the potential to expand more in the future. Matters relating to the IT industry are overseen by the Ministry of Information Technology of the Government of Pakistan. The IT industry is regarded as a successful sector of Pakistan economically, even during financial crisis. The first IT policy and implementation strategy was approved under the leadership of Atta-ur-Rahman, the Federal Minister of Science and Technology in August 2000 which laid the foundations of the development of this sector. The emphasis was placed on quality IT education in universities rather than numbers during this period. The quality measures introduced by Atta-ur-Rahman as Chairman of Higher Education Commission during 2002-2008 included:1) All PhD thesis were evaluated by eminent foreign scientists,2) All PhD thesis and research papers were checked for plagiarism 3) Some 11,000 students were sent abroad to leading universities for PhD level training and absorbed on their return, 4) Appointments at faculty positions were linked to international stature of the applicants as judged from their international publications, patents and citations, and (5) Quality Enhancement Cells were established in all universities for the first time in the history of the country. Thereafter two policies were launched by the Ministry of IT under the leadership of Anusha Rahman Khan, Federal Minister for IT and Telecom (2013-2018). The Telecom Policy was announced in December 2015, and later National Digital Pakistan Policy that was approved by the cabinet in May 2018.  In 2001, a 15 year tax holiday was approved to promote the IT industry which has the grown from $30 million to over $3 billion during the last 16 years. A nationwide programme to train teachers was initiated by Intel in March 2002 in Pakistan on the request of Atta-ur-Rahman which has resulted in the training of 220,000 teachers across 70 districts at no cost to the government. The government of Pakistan has given incentives to IT investors in the country during the last decade, this resulted in the development of the IT sector. From 2003 to 2005, the country's IT exports saw a rise of about fifty percent and amounted a total of about 48.5 million USD. The World Economic Forum, assessing the development of Information and Communication Technology in the country ranked Pakistan 111th among 144 countries in the Global Information Technology report of 2014. In an analysis of scientific research productivity of Pakistan, in comparison to Brazil, Russia, India and China, Thomson Reuters has applauded the developments that have taken place as a result of the reforms introduced by Atta-ur-Rahman, since Pakistan has emerged as the country with the highest increase in the percentage of highly cited papers in comparison to the "BRIC" countries. Atta-ur-Rahman is Co-Chairman of the Prime Ministers Task Force on Information Technology and Telecommunications. As a result of the measures introduced on the recommendation of the Task Force, there has been a sharp increase in software exports of Pakistan.

The Prime Minister of Pakistan established a National Task Force on "Technology Driven Knowledge Economy" which he himself chairs. Atta-ur-Rahman is the Vice Chairman of the Task Force and several national initiatives related to information technology have been launched under this Task Force. One important area of focus is that of Artificial Intelligence and a number of Centers of Excellence are being established by the Task Force in universities across the country

As of 2020, Pakistan has 85% teledensity with 183 million cellular, 98 million 3G/4G and 101 million broadband subscribers, due to the foundations laid by Atta-ur-Rahman of the IT and telecom industry during 2000-2008. Pakistan is now ranked as one of the top countries that have registered a high growth rate in internet penetration. Overall, it has the 10th largest number of internet users in the world

The period from 2013 to 2018 witnessed landmark revolution in the sector after the launch of 3g/4g technologies and IT industry is booming.

According to Bloomberg, 2021 saw a record year in Pakistan's technology sector, due in part to COVID-19 pandemic and the 2021 China tech crackdown.

E-government

The Government of Pakistan has attached great importance to information technology, as part of its efforts to develop an "information age" in the country. In this regard, an elaborate national IT policy was formulated under the leadership of Atta-ur-Rahman in 2000, then Federal Minister of Science & technology. Through a focus on the technological development of information technology, the government aims to increase productivity in the public sector, improve the standards of IT infrastructure in the country and use it as a management tool for the promotion of good governance in general. There has been remarkable progress in creating effective computerised e-government systems in Pakistan for major departments such as police, law enforcement agencies and district administration. The National Database and Registration Authority (NADRA) has also introduced computerised registration systems for issuing important documents such as national identity cards, passports, and permanent residency cards. IT has also been critically important in improving work procedures of the civil service and other government-related fields.

According to a study published by the UN Economic and Social Commission for Asia and the Pacific (ESCAP), Pakistan has been highly exposed to information technology while pursuing the concepts of e-governance and e-commerce:

Local-language computing
In 1994, an Indian software company- Concept Software Pvt Ltd,[1] led by Rarendra Singh & Vijay Gupta, with the collaboration of a UK company called Multilingual Solutions led by Kamran Rouhi, developed InPage Urdu for Pakistan's newspaper industry

Urdu

The Center for Research in Urdu Language Processing conducts research and development in linguistic and computational aspects of Urdu, as well as other languages of Pakistan, in areas such as speech processing, computational linguistics and script processing.

Sindhi
Sindhi has also been digitised to make it easier to publish Sindhi newspapers, magazines and books. InPage also offers support for Sindhi with the proper fonts and ligatures which makes it easier for people to type in the Sindhi language without any difficulty.

Software development in Pakistan
Software development is a rapidly growing field in Pakistan; The government has initiated numerous programs to encourage software development and exports. Pakistani IT companies have begun developing software for use in different types of businesses and services. Locally made software packages are available for implementation in schools, hospitals, supermarkets and other businesses at low cost. Large control systems such as ERPs are also developed for use in large organisations which manufacture textiles, pharmaceuticals, food and beverages, etc. Also, the increasing use of Android smartphones, tablets and Apple iPads has given a great boost to the mobile applications development industry. Experts can easily develop these applications at home, with very low capital investment, as a personal computer and an Internet connection are the only things required to begin. Educational institutes have also begun offering diplomas and short-courses in software and applications development for young people.

Information Technology Education in Pakistan
With an understanding that technology could be a big boon to local exports and can simultaneously provide Pakistan with much needed foreign exchange, Pakistan has invested aggressively both in information technology education.

See also

 National Science and Technology Park (NSTP)
 Arfa Karim Technology Park
 Communications in Pakistan
 Higher Education Commission of Pakistan
 Internet in Pakistan
 Science and technology of Pakistan
 Supercomputing in Pakistan
 Digital Pakistan
 Tania Aidrus

References

External links